Regiment University of Pretoria was an artillery regiment of the South African Artillery. As a reserve unit, it had a status roughly equivalent to that of a British Army Reserve or United States Army National Guard unit. It was part of the South African Army Artillery Corps.

Origin 
In the 1950s in South Africa, military units were attached to each large university. The University of Pretoria acquired an artillery capability.  The concept was for long term students to complete their obligatory military training in these units. Training would also be organised so as not to unduly interfere with university work.

1 Observation Battery 
On 1 May 1950 an observation and sound measurement battery affiliated to the existing 1 Observation Battery was established at the University of Pretoria under a Captain L.J. Le Roux.

By 1957 this battery was renamed P Battery. When 1 Observation Battery was divided on 1 January 1960, the elements at the university was renamed the Regiment University of Pretoria (SAA).

Association with 17 Field Artillery Regiment 
On 1 February 1974, the Regiment was renamed 17 Field Artillery Regiment and ended its close association with the university.

Insignia

Dress Insignia 
The insignia in the middle depicts that of University of Pretoria Military Unit. UPMU formed circa 1981 and disbanded in circa 1990.

References 

 Further reading:

External links 
 Defenceweb fact file
 Gunner's Association

Artillery regiments of South Africa
University of Pretoria
Military units and formations established in 1960
Military units and formations of South Africa in the Border War
Military units and formations of South Africa
Military units and formations disestablished in 1974